Liu Tingting (born 29 October 1990) is a Chinese athlete specializing in the hammer throw. She competed at two World Championships in Athletics, failing to reach the final both times. She was the 2015 Asian champion in the event, having won silver medals at the Asian Athletics Championships in 2011 and 2013.

She won a bronze medal for her native Liaoning at the 12th Chinese National Games.

Her personal best throw is 69.83 metres (Halle 2013).

International competitions

References

1990 births
Living people
Athletes from Liaoning
Chinese female hammer throwers
World Athletics Championships athletes for China
Athletes (track and field) at the 2016 Summer Olympics
Olympic athletes of China
20th-century Chinese women
21st-century Chinese women